Cincinnobotrys is a genus of flowering plants belonging to the family Melastomataceae.

Its native range is Tropical Africa.

Species:

Cincinnobotrys acaulis 
Cincinnobotrys burttianus 
Cincinnobotrys felicis 
Cincinnobotrys letouzeyi 
Cincinnobotrys malayanus 
Cincinnobotrys oreophilus 
Cincinnobotrys pauwelsianus 
Cincinnobotrys pulchellus 
Cincinnobotrys ranarum 
Cincinnobotrys speciosus

References

Melastomataceae
Melastomataceae genera
Afromontane flora